Shelbyville Senior High School is a public high school located in Shelbyville, Indiana, United States. It is managed by Shelbyville Central Schools.

Administration
Superintendent: Mary Harper
Principal: Brent Baker

Athletics
The school is a member of the Hoosier Heritage Conference. Their mascot is the golden bear.

The school offers the following Junior Varsity and Varsity level sports:
 Baseball
 Boys' Basketball
 Girls' Basketball
 Boys' and Girls' Bowling
 Boys' Cross Country
 Girls' Cross Country
 Football
 Boys' Golf
 Girls' Golf
 Boys' Soccer
 Girls' Soccer
 Softball
 Boys' Swimming and Diving
 Girls' Swimming and Diving
 Boys' Tennis
 Girls' Tennis
 Boys' Track and Field
 Girls' Track and Field
 Volleyball
 Wrestling

Basketball
The 1946-1947 Men's Basketball team won the Indiana High School Boys Basketball Tournament against Terre Haute Garfield High School, 54–46.

Notable alumni
 William Garrett - first African American Indiana "Mr. Basketball"
 Ken Gunning - college basketball player and head coach
Kid Quill - American hip hop recording artist

See also
 List of high schools in Indiana

References

External links
 Shelbyville Senior High School
 Golden Bears Twitter page
 Golden Bears Basketball Twitter page

Public high schools in Indiana
Schools in Shelby County, Indiana